David Noble Harpp is a Canadian chemist, science communicator and award-winning university teacher. He holds the Tomlinson Chair in Science Education at McGill University.

Harpp published more than 230 chemistry articles in peer-reviewed publications, his main research interest being organosulfur and selenium molecules. In addition, 20 of his articles on teaching innovation were published. He was appointed as Tomlinson Chair in Science Education in 2013, with the mandate to "advance the understanding and practice of science education".

With Joseph Schwarcz and Ariel Fenster, Harpp is a founding member of the Office for Science and Society.

Harpp experimented throughout his teaching career with various visual media, from photographic slides to 8mm movies. With his colleagues at the Office for Science and Society, he pioneered the McGill COurses ONline initiative. A proponent of massive open online courses, Harpp thinks students can benefit from having access these academic opportunities: "What if the best organic chemistry course, anywhere, was put on by somebody from, say, the University of Illinois, why shouldn’t we [assign it at our university]?"

Harpp is also interested in academic integrity. He followed up on his research on the prevalence of cheating by university students by inventing (with others) a computer program that spots cheating in multiple-answer exams. Use of the software, with the introduction of multiple versions of each exam, is credited to practically eliminating this type of cheating at McGill's: "I think 90 per cent of the students who tend to cheat will [look at all the obstacles] and say, 'Nah.'"

Harpp did his Bachelor of Arts at Middlebury College (1959), his Masters at Wesleyan University (1962) and his Ph.D. at the University of North Carolina (1965).

Selected awards

References 

Canadian chemists
Canadian skeptics
Living people
Anglophone Quebec people
Academic staff of McGill University
Science communicators
Year of birth missing (living people)